Mount Westminster is a mountain, 3,370 m, on the east side of Beardmore Glacier, standing 4 nautical miles (7 km) south of Mount Kinsey in the Supporters Range, in Antarctica. Discovered and named by the British Antarctic Expedition (1907–09). Named for Hugh Grosvenor, 2nd Duke of Westminster, a financial supporter of the expedition.

Mountains of the Ross Dependency
Dufek Coast